Fenton High School may refer to:

Fenton High School (Illinois), Bensenville, Illinois
Fenton High School (Michigan), Fenton, Michigan
Lake Fenton High School, Lake Fenton, Michigan